Oliver Rasmussen (born 6 November 2000) is a Danish racing driver currently competing in the World Endurance Championship for Jota.

Early career

Italian F4

2018 
Rasmussen started his single-seater career off with Jenzer Motorsport at the opening round of the 2018 Italian F4 Championship. Rasmussen completed the first ten races with 4 retirements and a best finish of 11th, a string of 3 retirements in a row starting at Monza's 2nd race left Rasmussen the only one of the 6 Jenzer drivers without a point. In race 2 at the Misano round a season best finish of 8th ended Rasmussen's points drought, things were looking good for him until the 3rd race he sustained a heavy crash with Prema driver Amna Al Qubaisi. The closest Rasmussen got to the points was a 13th-place finish, he ended the season 24th and last of his teammates.

2019 
He returned for the following season but this time for Prema Powerteam and with his first race of the season he beat his entire tally from the previous year. In the second race Rasmussen was handed a ten-second penalty for overtaking under the safety car resulting in a 14th-place finish. Despite a lot of good results, including three 4th places and a pole position at Imola it took until the final round of the season for Rasmussen to take a podium where he placed 3rd in the first and third race at Monza. Before his double podium Rasmussen was 10th in the championship but ended up finishing 7th, 6 points behind his nearest competitor.

ADAC F4
Rasmussen raced with Prema Powerteam in the ADAC Formula 4 in 2019. The first round of the season got off to a bad start, as he retired after he sustained damage crashing into Prema teammate Paul Aron. A handful of good results and points followed before he scored a career best 2nd and first podium of the season at Zandvoort due to Dennis Hauger and Gianluca Petecof crashing in the later stages of the race. Rasmussen went on to finish on the podium once more and end the season in 12th behind Paraguyan Joshua Dürksen.

Toyota Racing Series
mtec Motorsport and Rasmussen joined forced as he entered the Toyota Racing Series for the first time in 2020. He finished 11th with two podiums, one fastest lap and 158 points. His best result was 2nd, a race in which he shared the podium with FIA Formula 1 driver Yuki Tsunoda and FIA Formula 3 driver Lirim Zendeli.

FIA Formula 3 Championship

2021 

On 5 February 2021, Rasmussen confirmed that he would be moving up to the FIA Formula 3 Championship with HWA Racelab to partner Matteo Nannini and Rafael Villagómez. He did not score any points and achieved a best finish of 12th, during sprint race 2 at Zandvoort.

2022 
He then drove for Charouz Racing System and ART Grand Prix in the post-season test, but did not sign for either team in 2022, instead switching to the FIA World Endurance Championship. On 4 April 2022, however, it was announced that Rasmussen would be joining teams' champions Trident from round 2 after an ill-fated Jonny Edgar pulled out of the championship. In just his first time back, he achieved his first points finish by finishing seventh. He would not score any more points for the feature race and the Barcelona round.

Rasmussen was replaced at Silverstone by Edgar after the Brit recovered from his health issues. Rasmussen ranked 22nd in the standings with 4 points.

Sportscar career

2022: WEC debut
On 12 January 2022, Jota Sport announced that Rasmussen would join the team and drive the 28 car alongside Ed Jones and Johnathan Aberdein in the FIA World Endurance Championship. The team started out with a fifth place at Sebring, before a retirement at Spa-Francorchamps posed a setback for Rasmussen and his teammates. They would bounce back in strong fashion at the 24 Hours of Le Mans however, as the Jota 28 crew took a class podium, ending up third at the checkered flag. Rasmussen, Aberdein and Jones scored another third place at the penultimate race in Fuji and finished sixth in the teams' standings.

2023 
For the 2023 season, Rasmussen remained with Jota, being partnered by Pietro Fittipaldi and David Heinemeier Hansson.

Karting record

Karting career summary

Racing record

Racing career summary

† As Rasmussen was a guest driver, he was ineligible for points.* Season still in progress.

Complete Italian F4 Championship results
(key) (Races in bold indicate pole position) (Races in italics indicate fastest lap)

Complete ADAC Formula 4 Championship results
(key) (Races in bold indicate pole position) (Races in italics indicate fastest lap)

Complete Toyota Racing Series results 
(key) (Races in bold indicate pole position) (Races in italics indicate fastest lap)

Complete Formula Regional European Championship results
(key) (Races in bold indicate pole position) (Races in italics indicate fastest lap)

Complete FIA Formula 3 Championship results 
(key) (Races in bold indicate pole position; races in italics indicate points for the fastest lap of top ten finishers)

Complete IMSA SportsCar Championship results 
(key) (Races in bold indicate pole position; races in italics indicate fastest lap)

† Points only counted towards the Michelin Endurance Cup, and not the overall LMP2 Championship.

Complete FIA World Endurance Championship results
(key) (Races in bold indicate pole position) (Races in italics indicate fastest lap)

* Season still in progress.

Complete 24 Hours of Le Mans results

References

External links
 

2000 births
Living people
Danish racing drivers
French racing drivers
French people of Danish descent
ADAC Formula 4 drivers
Formula Regional European Championship drivers
FIA Formula 3 Championship drivers
Jenzer Motorsport drivers
Prema Powerteam drivers
HWA Team drivers
Trident Racing drivers
24 Hours of Le Mans drivers
Italian F4 Championship drivers
Toyota Racing Series drivers
FIA World Endurance Championship drivers
WeatherTech SportsCar Championship drivers
R-ace GP drivers
Jota Sport drivers
G-Drive Racing drivers